Proterocameroceras is an early Endocerid from the upper Lower Ordovician belong to the Proterocameroceratidae, characterized by a rather large, straight, longiconic shell, short chambers, generally straight sutures, and large ventral siphuncle with short septal necks, thick complex connecting rings, and endocones with three endosiphuncular blades toward the apex.

Proterocameroceas has been found in N America, Greenland, Siberia, and Australia

References
 Curt Teichert, 1964.  Endoceratoidea. Treatise on Invertebrate Paleontology, Part K. Geol Soc. of America and Univ of Kansas press. Teichert and Moore (eds)

Fossils of Greenland
Nautiloids
Ordovician cephalopods
Fossils of Russia
Prehistoric nautiloid genera